Park Soo-il (Korean: 박수일; born 22 February 1996) is a South Korean footballer.

Club career
For the 2017 season, Park signed for South Korean third division side Gimhae.

For the 2018 season, he signed for Daejeon Hana Citizen in the South Korean second division.

For the 2020 season, he signed for top flight club Seongnam.

References

External links
 

Living people
South Korean footballers
Association football midfielders
Association football defenders
Gimhae FC players
Daejeon Hana Citizen FC players
Seongnam FC players
K League 1 players
K League 2 players
Korea National League players
1996 births